Chita Drita is the second studio album by Ukrainian singer Verka Serduchka released in 2003 by Mamamusic.

Overview
Unlike the previous album, this album was written as a cohesive work. A team of authors led by Andrey Danilko, who wrote both words and music. Ukrainian songwriter Arkady Gartsman and composer Gennady Krupnik were also involved in the work on the album. The author of two songs on the album was Konstanin Gnatenko. Recording took place at Mamamusic Studio in Kyiv, and mastering took place in Moscow.

The song "Ty - na sever, ya - na yug" was recorded with Ukrainian singer Iryna Bilyk, it was the first song in Russian in her discography. Next year it will be included on her first Russian-language album Lyubov. Yad. Iryna Bilyk is also the author of music and lyrics.

The album features the bonus song "Mne tak nuzhna lyubov tvoya", which is designated as performed by Andrey Danilko. "For dessert" there is a remix of the song "Ya rozhdena dlya lyubvi".

Singles
Six singles were released from the album for radio rotation. "Chita-drita" was released before the album release. The third single "Novogodnyaya" was released with the first reissue of the album. It became the leader of the radio airwaves, taking first place in the weekly CIS rating, and took second place in the annual one. The song "Yolki" reached the top ten of the charts in the CIS and Ukraine. "Ya popala na lyubov" reached number 62 on the CIS chart.

Semyon Gorov shot music videos for songs "Chita-drita", "Tuk, tuk, tuk", "Ya popala na lyubov".

Editions
The album was released in 2003. The cover featured Verka Serduchka wearing floral wreath and fur coat with a dove in her hand against the background of a blooming field. In the same year on the Eve of the New Year, the album was reissued with a new song "Novogodnyaya", the design of the album also changed: this time Verka stood in a snowdrift with the night sky in the background. In 2004 the album was reissued again and again with a new song "Yolki", this time Verka stood against the background of the Northern lights.

Awards and nominations
In 2005 the album won the Record Awards in the category "Album of the year by an artist from near abroad". For the song "Tuk, tuk, tuk" Verka Serduchka received the Golden Gramophone.

Track listing

Personnel
Musicians
 Andrey Danilko – lead vocals (all tracks), songwriting (2-9, 11-14), production (all tracks)
 Arkady Gartsman – songwriting (2, 4, 5, 12)
 Konstantin Gnatenko – songwriting (6, 7)
 Iryna Bilyk – lead vocals (10), songwriting (10), production (10)
 Vitaly Kurovsky – songwriting (11)
 Lyubasha – songwriting (1)
 Gennady Krupnik – songwriting (2, 11), production (all tracks), background vocals (2, 4–8, 10, 13-14), keyboards, guitar (7-9, 11, 12, 14)
 Natalia Rebrik – background vocals (3, 4, 8)
 Anna Gonchar — background vocals (3, 4, 8)
 Natalia Gura – background vocals (2, 5, 7, 12, 14)
 Sergey Dobrovolsky – guitar (6, 10, 13)
 Vladimir Kopota – trumpet (3, 4)

Technical
 Sergey Dobrovolsky – recording (all tracks), mixing (all tracks)

Studios
 Mamamusic Studio (2003, 2004, Kyiv, Ukraine) – recording (all tracks)
 SBI (2003, 2004, Moscow, Russia) – mastering (all tracks)

Management and marketing
 Yury Nikitin / Nova Management – management, executive production
 Tatyana Krupnik – project management
 Andrey Petrov – photography 
 Alexey Patekhin – design
 Andrey Danilko – style

Charts

Release history

References

2003 albums
Verka Serduchka albums
Mamamusic albums
Russian-language albums